The canton of Joigny is an administrative division of the Yonne department, central France. Its borders were modified at the French canton reorganisation which came into effect in March 2015. Its seat is in Joigny.

It consists of the following communes:
 
Béon
La Celle-Saint-Cyr
Cézy
Champlay
Cudot
Joigny
Looze
Précy-sur-Vrin
Saint-Aubin-sur-Yonne
Saint-Julien-du-Sault
Saint-Loup-d'Ordon
Saint-Martin-d'Ordon
Verlin
Villecien
Villevallier

References

Cantons of Yonne